Promwad is an independent electronics design house in Eastern Europe headquartered in Vilnius, Lithuania. It is engaged in contract electronics design, software development and contract manufacturing for customers in Europe and America.

The company received media attention for some of its software and hardware designs for video streaming and digital TV, telecom, automotive, IoT and industrial automation.

History
Roman Pakholkov founded Promwad in 2004 to design mass-produced electronics devices based on System on a chip (SoC) and Linux. The company started operating from Minsk, Belarus, and gradually moved its business portfolio to the European Union. In 2016, Promwad opened an office in Vilnius, which is now the company's headquarters. 
In 2021, the company delivery office was opened in Germany, and a development centre opened  in Latvia.

Partners
In 2011, Promwad became an official partner of Texas Instruments and joined the international network of design houses that develop electronics based on TI components and solutions.

References

External links
 

Technology companies of Lithuania
Companies based in Vilnius
Industrial design firms
Engineering companies of Europe
Technology companies established in 2004
Electronics companies established in 2004
2004 establishments in Belarus